Riesz's lemma (after Frigyes Riesz) is a lemma in functional analysis. It specifies (often easy to check) conditions that guarantee that a subspace in a normed vector space is dense. The lemma may also be called the Riesz lemma or Riesz inequality. It can be seen as a substitute for orthogonality when the normed space is not an inner product space.

Statement

The proof can be found in functional analysis texts such as Kreyszig. An online proof from Prof. Paul Garrett is available. 

 
Because every vector subspace (such as ) contains the origin  substituting  in this infimum shows that  for every vector  In particular,  when  is a unit vector. 

Using this new notation, the conclusion of Riesz's lemma may be restated more succinctly as:  holds for some 

Using this new terminology, Riesz's lemma may also be restated in plain English as:

Given any closed proper vector subspace of a normed space  for any desired minimum distance  less than  there exists some vector in the unit sphere of  that is  this desired distance away from the subspace. 

Minimum distances  not satisfying the hypotheses

When  is trivial then it has no  vector subspace  and so Riesz's lemma holds vacuously for all real numbers  The remainder of this section will assume that  which guarantees that a unit vector exists. 

The inclusion of the hypotheses  can be explained by considering the three cases:  is non-negative,  and  
The lemma holds when  since every unit vector  satisfies the conclusion  The hypotheses  is included solely to exclude this trivial case and is sometimes omitted from the lemma's statement. 

Another of consequence of  being impossible is that the inequality  holds if and only if equality  holds.

This leaves only  in which case the statement becomes:
for every closed proper vector subspace  of  there exists some vector  of unit norm that satisfies 

When  is a Banach space, then this statement is true if and only if  is a reflexive space. 
So in a non-reflexive Banach space, such as the Lebesgue space  of all bounded sequences, Riesz's lemma does not hold for  
However, every finite dimensional normed space is a reflexive Banach space, so Riesz's lemma does holds for  when the normed space is finite-dimensional, as will now be shown. Since the distance function  is continuous, its image on the closed unit ball  must be a compact subset of the real line, proving the claim.

Some consequences

Such an infinite sequence of vectors cannot be found in the unit sphere of any finite dimensional normed space (just consider for example the unit circle in ). 

This sequence can be constructed by induction. Start by picking any element  from the unit sphere. Pick  from the unit sphere such that

Clearly  contains no convergent subsequence and the non-compactness of the unit ball follows.

Characterization of finite dimension

Riesz's lemma can be applied directly to show that the unit ball of an infinite-dimensional normed space  is never compact. 

More generally, if a topological vector space  is locally compact, then it is finite dimensional. The converse of this is also true. Namely, if a topological vector space is finite dimensional, it is locally compact. Therefore local compactness characterizes finite-dimensionality. This classical result is also attributed to Riesz. A short proof can be sketched as follows: let  be a compact neighborhood of the origin in  By compactness, there are  such that

But compact sets are bounded, so  lies in the closure of  This proves the result. For a different proof based on Hahn–Banach theorem see .

Spectral theory

The spectral properties of compact operators acting on a Banach space are similar to those of matrices. Riesz's lemma is essential in establishing this fact.

Other applications

As detailed in the article on infinite-dimensional Lebesgue measure, this is useful in showing the non-existence of certain measures on infinite-dimensional Banach spaces. Riesz's lemma also shows that the identity operator on a Banach space  is compact if and only if  is finite-dimensional.

See also

References

  
  
  
  
  

Functional analysis
Lemmas in analysis
Normed spaces